The Iris Prize, established in  by Berwyn Rowlands of The Festivals Company, is an international LGBT film prize and festival which is open to any film which is by, for, about or of interest to gay, lesbian, bisexual, transgender or intersex audiences and which must have been completed within two years of the prize deadline.

The prize is open to filmmakers from around the world and judged by a panel of international filmmakers and artists. The winner receives the largest prize for a gay and lesbian film in the world—a package valued at £30,000—allowing the winner to make their next film. It is awarded during an annual festival held in Cardiff that presents a programme of screenings including the competing films, several feature films, panel sessions with visiting filmmakers and culminates in a closing night award ceremony.

The Iris Prize has secured the support of lesbian and gay film festivals from around the world, creating a single international platform with the intention of raising the profile of lesbian and gay cinema and helping a new generation of filmmakers achieve success on the international stage. Each of the partner festivals selects one film annually to participate in the Iris Prize. The partner festivals include LGBTQ+film festivals in Toronto, Los Angeles, New York, Sydney, Dublin, San Francisco, Philadelphia, Hong Kong, and Rochester, New York.

The journalist Andrew Pierce became the first chair of the Iris Prize in 2013. Tom Abell, Managing Director of Peccadillo Pictures succeeded Pierce as chair in 2021.

In 2015 Iris Prize Outreach - the charity set up to challenge discrimination against LGBTQ+ people - was awarded funding from the National Lottery Community Fund to undertake an ambitious programme of community engagement across Wales over three years.  A second project  was awarded funding in 2020 and is expected to see ten new short films made.

Iris Prize Winners 
 2007 - Pariah by Dee Rees (USA)
 2008 - Cowboy by Till Kleinert (Germany)
 2009 - Steam by Eldar Rapaport (USA)
 2010 - The Samaritan by Magnus Mork (Norway)
 2011 - I Don't Want to Go Back Alone by Daniel Ribeiro (Brazil)
 2012 - The Wilding by Grant Scicluna (Australia)
 2013 - Gorilla by Tim Marshall (Australia)
 2014 - All God's Creatures by Brendan McDonall (Australia)
 2015 - Vessels by Arkasha Stevenson (USA)
 2016 - Balcony by Toby Fell-Holden (UK)
 2017 - Mother Knows Best by Mikael Bundsen (Sweden)
 2018 - Three Centimetres by Lara Zeidan (Lebanon/UK)
 2019 - Black Hat by Sarah Smith (USA)
 2020 - Short Calf Muscle by Victoria Warmerdam (Netherlands)
 2021 - Baba by Adam Ali and Sam Arbor (UK)
 2022 - Tarneit by John Sheedy (Australia)

Best British Short Winners 
 2007 - Private Life by Abbe Robinson 
 2008 - James by Connor Clements
 2009 - Diana by Aleem Khan
 2010 - Mosa by Ana Moreno
 2011 - The Red Bike by Andrew Steggall
 2012 - A Stable for Disabled Horses by Fabio Youniss
 2013 - My Mother by Jay Bedwani
 2014 - Middle Man by Charlie Francis
 2015 - Closets by Lloyd Eyre-Morgan
 2016 - Balcony by Toby Fell-Holden
 2017 - We Love Moses by Dionne Edwards
 2018 - BEYOND (There’s Always a Black Issue, Dear)  by Claire Lawrie
 2019 - My Brother is a Mermaid by Alfie Dale
 2020 - Better by Michael J Ferns 
 2021 - Baba by Adam Ali and Sam Arbor
 2022 - Queer Parivaar by Shiva Raichandani

Iris Prize Best Feature Award Winners 
 2008 - Dream Boy by James Bolton (USA)
 2009 - Red Woods by David Lewis (USA)
 2010 - My Friend from Faro by Nana Neul (Germany)
 2011 - August by Eldar Rapaport (USA)
 2012 - Sex of Angels by Xavier Vilaverde (Spain)
 2013 - Cupcakes (Bananot) by Eytan Fox (Israel)
 2014 - Boy Meets Girl by Eric Schaeffer (USA)
 2015 - 4th Man Out by Andrew Nackman (USA)
 2016 - Real Boy by Shaleece Haas (USA)
 2017 - Prom King, 2010 by Christopher Schaap (USA)
 2018 - 1985 by Yen Tan (USA)
 2019 - And Then We Danced by Levan Akin (Sweden/Georgia)
 2020 - Cocoon by Leonie Krippendorff (Germany)
 2021 - Rebel Dykes by Harri Shanahan and Siân A. Williams (UK)
 2022 - Metamorphosis by Jose Enrique Tiglao (Philippines)

Best Performance in a Male Role 
 2011 - Murray Bartlett, August
 2012 - Ohad Knoller, Yossi
 2013 - Ryan Steele, Five Dances
 2014 - Michael Welch, Boy Meets Girl
 2015 - Davide Capone, Darker Than Midnight (Più buio di mezzanotte)
 2016 - Thom Green, Downriver
 2017 - Miles Szanto, Teenage Kicks
 2018 - Félix Maritaud, Sauvage
 2019 - Henry Golding, Monsoon
 2020 - Leandro Faria Lelo, Dry Wind (Vento seco)
 2021 - Udo Kier, Swan Song
 2022 - Giancarlo Commare, Mascarpone

Best Performance in a Male Role, British Film
 2022 - Gary Fannin, Jim

Best Performance in a Female Role 
 2011 – Allison Lane, Going Down in LA-LA Land
 2012 – Kristina Valada-Viars, Molly's Girl
 2013 – Sabine Wolf, Two Mothers
 2014 – Kate Trotter, Tru Love
 2015 – Sigrid ten Napel, Summer (Zomer)
 2016 – Kerry Fox, Downriver
 2017 – Fawzia Mirza, Signature Move
 2018 – Jamie Chung, 1985
 2019 – Linda Caridi, Mom + Mom
 2020 - Lena Urzendowsy, Cocoon
 2021 - Senan Kara, Not Knowing
 2022 - Lacey Oake, Before I Change My Mind

Best Performance in a Female Role, British Film
 2022 - Claudia Jolly, Tommies

Best Performance Beyond the Binary
 2022 - Gold Azeron, Metamorphosis

Youth Jury Award 
 2013 – Straight With You, Daan Bol (Netherlands)
 2014 – Bombshell, Erin Sanger (USA)
 2015 – Closets, Lloyd Eyre-Morgan (UK)
 2016 – Sign, Andrew Keenan-Bolger (USA)
 2017 – Lily, Graham Cantwell (Ireland)
 2018 – Mrs McCutcheon, John Sheedy (Australia)
 2019 – My Brother is a Mermaid, Alfie Dale (UK)
 2020 - Wings, Jamie Weston (UK)
 2021 - S.A.M., Neil Ely and Lloyd Eyre Morgan (UK)
 2022 - Breathe, Harm van der Sanden (Netherlands)

Diva Box Office Award 
 2019 – Greta, Sparkman Clark (USA)

Co-op Audience Award 
 2020 - Wings by Jamie Weston
 2021 - Birthday Boy by Leo Lebeau & James Bell

Community Awards
 2022, Community Short: Want/Need, Niamh Buckland
 2022, Education Short: The Bed, Thalia Kent-Egan
 2022, Micro short: Hold Me Close Please, Max Roberts

List of partner festivals 
Each of the partner festivals listed below will select one film that will be automatically shortlisted for the Iris Prize.

Inside Out Film and Video Festival, Toronto (CA)
Outfest – Los Angeles Gay and Lesbian Film Festival (US)
Frameline - San Francisco International LGBT Film Festival (US)
Hong Kong Lesbian and Gay Film Festival (CN)
Queer Screen  – Sydney’s Mardi Gras Film Festival (AU)
NewFest - New York Lesbian, Gay, Bisexual, & Transgender Film Festival (US)
QFest Philadelphia (US)
ImageOut: The Rochester LGBT Film & Video Festival (US)
KASHISH Mumbai International Queer Film Festival (IN)
Queer Lisboa - International Queer Film Festival (PT)
Mezipatra, Prague (CZ)
Oslo Fusion International Film Festival (NO)
GAZE, Dublin (IE)
Cheries, Cheris - Paris (FR)
Roze Filmdagen, Amsterdam (NL)
MIX Copenhagen (DK)
Festival MIX Brasil, Sao Paulo (BR)
Hamburg International Queer Film Festival (DE)
Shanghai Pride Film Festival, Shanghai (CN)
aGLIFF, Austin (US)
Melbourne Queer Film Festival (AU)
Scilia Queer, Palermo (IT)
TLVFest, Tel-Aviv (IL)
British Urban Film Festival, London (GB)

References

External links 

Official homepage
Iris Prize at Theatre Wales

LGBT film awards
LGBT film festivals in the United Kingdom
Film festivals in Wales
Festivals in Cardiff
LGBT events in Wales
2007 establishments in the United Kingdom